Walker Edmiston (February 6, 1926 – February 15, 2007) was an American puppeteer, and radio, television and voice actor.

Early years
Born in St. Louis, Missouri, Edmiston participated in local theater productions during his high school years. He later studied at the Pasadena Playhouse.

Career
Edmiston appeared on various television programs in character roles during the 1950s–1970s.

Before working on network programs, Edmiston had puppet shows on KTLA-TV in Los Angeles. His voice was heard on the puppet programs The Buffalo Billy Show and Time for Beany and on Dumbo's Circus, which included live action and animation. He was also a member of the cast of Lidsville and voiced characters on Pandemonium.

He appeared in the Star Trek episode The Corbomite Maneuver as the voice of Balok, and episodes of Gunsmoke, Mission: Impossible, Knots Landing, Adam-12, and The Dukes of Hazzard. He also played a character based on "Chester" in "Gun-Shy," the Maverick parody of Gunsmoke starring James Garner. In 1966, Edmiston had a recurring role as Regan in the short-lived ABC comedy western series The Rounders with co-stars Ron Hayes, Patrick Wayne, and Chill Wills.

Edmiston also did many television commercials and cartoon character voices, such as "Ernie the Keebler Elf" in hundreds of commercials for the cookie products of the Keebler Company, and voices for characters on H.R. Pufnstuf and The Bugaloos from the studios of Sid and Marty Krofft, as well as a recurring role as Enik the Altrusian on that studio's Land of the Lost. He also did many character voices on the Focus on the Family radio program, Adventures in Odyssey, in which he played the beloved Tom Riley and the infamous Bart Rathbone (and numerous other one-shot characters), for more than twenty years. At times the two characters would argue; however, Edmiston would require little redubbing or editing. He simply switched between the two characters without pause. After his death in 2007, the character of Riley was retired from the show, while Rathbone would make one more appearance (voiced by Robert Easton) before subsequently being written out as well.

Some of his voice credits were under the stage name Walter Edmiston. In 1985, he also voiced the Autobot Inferno in The Transformers.

In the 1950s and early 1960s, he hosted The Walker Edmiston Show, a children's television program in Los Angeles, California. The program featured puppets of his own creation including Kingsley the Lion, Ravenswood the Buzzard, and Webster Webfoot.

In 1962, Edmiston and his family moved to Phoenix, Arizona, where he began a daily puppet show on KOOL-TV. He also was a stage director at Children's Theater in Phoenix.

Personal life and death
Edmiston married Evelyn in 1950, and together they had two children, daughters Andria and Erin. Evelyn died in 1998.

Edmiston died from cancer in Woodland Hills, California on February 15, 2007. He is interred at Hollywood Forever Cemetery in Hollywood, California.

Filmography

 Smoked Hams (1947) — Wally Walrus (voice, uncredited) 
 Beany and Cecil (1949, TV Series) — Dishonest John (voice)
 By Word of Mouse (1954) — Lecturer (voice, uncredited)
 Everything's Ducky (1961) — Scuttlebutt - The Duck (voice)
 The Flintstones (1962, TV Series) — J. Montague Gypsum (voice)
 Hitler (1962) — S.S. Man (uncredited)
 The Beach Girls and the Monster (1965) — Mark / Kingsley the Lion
 Stagecoach (1966) — Cheyenne Wells Fargo Agent (uncredited)
Star Trek (1966)— episode "The Corbomite Maneuver"—Balok (voice)
 The Monkees (1967, TV Series) — Newspaper Publisher ("Monkee Mayor")
Star Trek (1968, TV Series) — episode "The Gamesters of Triskelion"—Provider 2 (voice)
 The Green Berets (1968) — Lt. Moore (uncredited)
 Bullitt (1968) — (voice, uncredited)
 H.R. Pufnstuf (1969, TV Series) — Dr. Blinky / Seymore Spider / Ludicrous Lion / Chief Redwood / Peter Lorre Tree / Grandfather Clock / East Wind / North Wind (voice)
 Start the Revolution Without Me (1970) — (voice, uncredited)
 Pufnstuf (1970) — Dr. Blinky / Ludicrous Lion / Seymore Spider / Candle / Hippie Tree (voice)
 The Bugaloos (1970, TV Series) — Sparky / Funky Rat / Woofer / Peter Platter / Magico The Magician / Nutty Bird / Peacock (voice)
 The Andromeda Strain (1971) — (voice, uncredited)
 Escape from the Planet of the Apes (1971) — Talking Baby Chimp (voice, uncredited)
Bonanza (1971, TV series)— episode "Cassie" -- auctioneer
 One More Train to Rob (1971) — Engineer (uncredited)
 Willy Wonka & the Chocolate Factory (1971) — Mr. Slugworth/Mr. Wilkinson (voice, uncredited)
 Lidsville (1971, TV Series) — Raunchy Rabbit / Bela / Borris / Jack of Clubs / Hiram / Admiral Scuttlebutt / Big Chief Sitting Duck (voice)
 Yogi's Ark Lark (1972, TV Series) — Squiddly Diddly / Yakky Doodle (voice)
 Mission Impossible (1972, TV Series) — as Peter Wiley / Episode: Casino
 Sigmund and the Sea Monsters (1973, TV Series) — Sigmund (voice)
 The All-American Boy (1973) — Minor Role (uncredited)
 Down and Dirty Duck (1974) — Bus Driver / Jail Orator / Small Fag / Prospector / Mexican Official / President / Man in Elevator (voice)
 Land of the Lost (1974–1976, TV Series) — Enik / Jefferson Davis Collie III
 Trilogy of Terror (1975, TV Movie) — Zuni Fetish Doll (voice, uncredited)
 The Bob Newhart Show (1977)  "Desperate Sessions"  Sergeant Webber
 The Waltons (1977) Episode: "The Hiding Place" - Franklin D Roosevelt and Edward R Murrow (voices)
 Loose Shoes (1978) — Pa
 Wholly Moses! (1980) — God (voice)
 Scared to Death (1981) — Police Chief Dennis Warren
 Buck Rogers in the 25th Century (1981, TV Series) — Koldar ("The Dorian Secret")
 Spider-Man (1981, TV Series) — Magneto ("When Magneto Speaks... People Listen")
 Spider-Man and His Amazing Friends (1981, TV Series) — Kingpin ("Pawns of the Kingpin"), Frankenstein's Monster ("The Transylvanian Connection")
 The Smurfs (1981) — Additional voices (voice)
 The American Adventure (1982) — Andrew Carnegie / Man in Rocking Chair (voice)
 Pandamonium (1982) — Algeron (voice)
 The Bear (1984) — Dr. Rose
 The Dukes of Hazzard (1979-1985, TV Series) — Professor Crandall
 Dumbo's Circus (1985, TV Series) — Sebastian (voice)
 The Transformers (1985–1986, TV Series) — Inferno (voice)
 The Great Mouse Detective (1986) — Citizen / Thug Guard #1 (voice)
 The Transformers: The Movie (1986) — Inferno (voice, scenes deleted)
 Adventures in Odyssey (1987-2008, audio drama series) — Bart Rathbone / Tom Riley (voice)
 Fat Man and Little Boy (1989) (voice)
 Disney's Adventures of the Gummi Bears (1989–1991, TV Series) — Sir Thornberry
 Dick Tracy (1990) — Radio Announcer #4 (voice)
 Spider-Man (1997, TV Series) — Whizzer/Robert Frank
 Whisper of the Heart (1995) — Kita (English version, voice)
 Ben 10 (2006, TV Series) — Marty / Ice Cream Employee ("Permanent Retirement")
 Avatar: The Last Airbender (2006, TV Series) — Fire Lord Azulon (final role)

References

External links
 
 
 CONELRAD Appreciation (archived)
 Walker Edmiston at Mark Evanier's News From Me (14 articles, from 1996 through to 2007 obituary)

1926 births
2007 deaths
American male radio actors
American male television actors
American male voice actors
Burials at Hollywood Forever Cemetery
Deaths from cancer in California
Male actors from Los Angeles
Male actors from St. Louis
Hanna-Barbera people
20th-century American male actors